Shams ul Haq Lone is a Pakistani politician who is member-elect of the Gilgit Baltistan Assembly.

Political career
Lone contested 2020 Gilgit-Baltistan Assembly election on 15 November 2020 from constituency GBA-14 (Astore-II) on the ticket of Pakistan Tehreek-e-Insaf. He won the election by the margin of 2469 votes over the runner up Muzaffar Ali of Pakistan Peoples Party. He garnered 5,354 votes while Ali received 2,885votes.

References

Living people
Gilgit-Baltistan MLAs 2020–2025
Politicians from Gilgit-Baltistan
1976 births